The Aristotelian Society for the Systematic Study of Philosophy, more generally known as the Aristotelian Society, is a philosophical society in London.

History
Aristotelian Society was founded at a meeting on 19 April 1880, at 17 Bloomsbury Square, London.

It resolved "to constitute a society of about twenty and to include ladies; the society to meet fortnightly, on Mondays at 8 o'clock, at the rooms of the Spelling Reform Association…" The rules of the society stipulated:

According to H. Wildon Carr, in choosing a name for the society, it was:

The society's first president was Mr. Shadworth H. Hodgson. He was president for fourteen years from 1880 until 1894, when he proposed Dr. Bernard Bosanquet as his replacement.

Professor Alan Willard Brown noted in 1947 that '[The Society]'s members were not all men of established intellectual position. It welcomed young minds just out of university as well as older amateur philosophers with serious interests and purposes. But many distinguished men were faithful members, and not the least virtue of the society has remained, even to the present day, the opportunity it affords for different intellectual generations to meet in an atmosphere of reasoned and responsible discussion.'."

The society continues to meet fortnightly at the University of London's Senate House to hear and discuss philosophical papers from all philosophical traditions. The current President (2016–2017) is Tim Crane, a Professor of Philosophy at University of Cambridge. Its other work includes giving grants to support the organisation of academic conferences in philosophy, and, with Oxford University Press, the production of the 'Lines of Thought' series of philosophical monographs.

Annual conference
The society's annual conference, organised since 1918 in conjunction with the Mind Association, (publishers of the philosophical journal Mind), is known as the Joint Session of the Aristotelian Society and the Mind Association, and is hosted by different university departments in July each year.

Publications

The first edition of the society's proceedings, the Proceedings of the Aristotelian Society for the Systematic Study of Philosophy, now the Proceedings of the Aristotelian Society, was issued in 1888.

Papers from invited speakers at the Joint Session conference are published in June each year (i.e., before the joint conference) in The Proceedings of the Aristotelian Society, Supplementary Volume.

The Proceedings and the Supplementary Volume are published by the society and distributed by Oxford University Press. The back run of both journals has been digitised by JSTOR.

List of current and past presidents
Many significant philosophers have served the society as its president:

Notes

References

 Brown, A.W., "The Metaphysical Society: Victorian Minds in Crisis, 1869–1880" New York: Columbia University Press (1947)
 Carr, H.W., "The Fiftieth Session: A Retrospect", Proceedings of the Aristotelian Society, Vol.29, (1928–1929), pp. 359–386.

External links 
 The Aristotelian Society for the Systematic Study of Philosophy

History of philosophy
Philosophical societies in the United Kingdom
Organizations established in 1880
1880 establishments in England